This is a list of songs written about, dedicated to, or commonly associated with the University of Illinois Urbana-Champaign. Most of the songs have been composed before 1940, and many were originally submitted in campus songwriting contests.

Presently popular

The following songs still see regular performance at the university, specifically through the Marching Illini. Other organizations, such as the Varsity Men's Glee Club, will also perform these songs. They are strongly recognized as university songs.

Performed in the past
The following songs used to see regular performance through the university band or orchestra, campus glee clubs, or other means. As of recent history, they are no longer performed regularly.

Notes

References

See also
 Fight song
 Alma mater (song)

American college songs
Institutional songs
University of Illinois Urbana-Champaign
Lists of songs